Gardeners' World is a long-running British gardening programme, first broadcast on 5 January 1968. The 2023 series is the 54th. Its first series was presented by Ken Burras and came from Oxford Botanical Gardens. Up until 2020 most of its episodes have been 30 minutes in duration; however, this changed in spring 2020 when the format was extended to an hour. All episodes in the 2021 series onwards follow this 60-minute format. Gardeners' World currently airs between mid-March and late October on BBC Two every Friday. The programme usually takes a three-month winter break from November to February.

The programme's main presenter is currently Monty Don. Other regular presenters include Adam Frost, Frances Tophill, Joe Swift, Arit Anderson, Advolly Richmond, Nick Bailey, Carol Klein, Mark Lane and Rachel de Thame. The magazine BBC Gardeners' World is a tie-in to the programme.

Presenters

Lead
Lead presenters have included:
Ken Burras (1968–1969)
Percy Thrower (1969–1976)
Arthur Billitt (1976–1979)
Geoff Hamilton (1979–1996)
Geoffrey Smith (1980–1982)
Alan Titchmarsh (1996–2002)
Monty Don (2003–2008)
Toby Buckland (2008–2010)
Monty Don (2011–present)

Co-presenters
Co-presenters have included:
Alys Fowler, Chris Baines, Chris Beardshaw, Mary Spiller, Liz Rigby, Diarmuid Gavin, Clay Jones, Stefan Buczacki, Christine Walkden, Sarah Raven, Gay Search, Anne Swithinbank, Nigel Colborn, Geoffrey Smith, Roy Lancaster, Peter Seabrook, Joe Swift, Ali Ward, Pippa Greenwood, Rachel de Thame, Frances Tophill, Carol Klein, Bob Flowerdew, Mark Lane, Adam Frost, Arit Anderson, John Kelly, Nick Bailey, Flo Headlam, Arthur Parkinson, JJ Chalmers, and Sue Kent.

Locations
Since its inception in 1968, the show was presented until 2003 from the lead presenter's own garden. In 2011, the show returned to this practice. 
First was Percy Thrower's The Magnolias in Shrewsbury
Then Arthur Billitt's Clack's Farm at Ombersley in Worcestershire
Followed by two gardens, both called Barnsdale, owned by Geoff Hamilton in Rutland
Next was Alan Titchmarsh's garden at Woodroyd in Alton, Hampshire, renamed Barleywood for the programme
Next was a rented garden, called Burmans Farm at Shottery in Stratford-upon-Avon which was called Berryfields for the purposes of the programme although it was often described as a 'top secret location near Birmingham'
Partly as a result of changes in the presenters, for the 2009 series the garden was relocated to Edgbaston in Birmingham. A playing-field was redeveloped and this garden was given the name Greenacre. This garden was intended to be a permanent home for the programme.
In 2011, with the return of Monty Don, the base relocated to Don's own garden Longmeadow in Herefordshire.

Critical response
As the primary gardening programme on BBC Television, the programme has attracted vocal opinion on the merits both of its presenters and its content. The 2009 season introduced several new features, many of which were not well received. Criticism was especially harsh regarding the high cost of certain features such as the hard landscaping and raised-beds and what was widely regarded as the dumbed-down and derivative content. The 'Cool Wall' which mimicked Top Gear, a competition for training places which aped The Apprentice, children from CBeebies and content such as a feature on garden gnomes annoyed many viewers. Much of the widespread criticism was also directed at the fact that the show no longer came from a real garden. But 'Greenacre' was a field, part of Winterbourne Botanic Garden in Birmingham.

The 2010 show saw public approval change, after alterations to the show's production. The show's length was returned to the original 30 minutes and several features of the 2009 series, such as the '30 second fix', were dropped. The show concentrated more on gardening content, reintroducing 'Jobs for the weekend' and focusing on plant species.

In March 2011 Monty Don returned as the main presenter of the programme.

In 2016 new executive producer Paolo Proto (previously producer of The Great British Bake Off) extended the programme from 30 minutes to one hour in September and October, also introducing new presenters Adam Frost, Frances Tophill, Nick Bailey, Nick Macer, Florence Headlam and Arit Anderson.

On 20 August 2021 the programme featured a visit, to Monty Don's garden at Longmeadow, by Camilla, Duchess of Cornwall.

Theme tunes
The very first theme tune to the series in 1968 was a piece composed by Peter Craddy and played by Michael Saxton on clarinet. A year later this was replaced by the long-running Green Fingers composed by John Clarke and Reg Reid, played by Harold Rich & His Players, a version of which, with sweeping strings, was soon used. The most famous theme, which had the longest run from the late 1980s through the 1990s and is still heard in a slightly classical vein today, is a guitar piece that was composed by Nick Webb and Greg Carmichael. It had two titles, one for commercial release and one for library, Morning Light and Natural Elements. Natural Elements was the title track of a commercial album released in 1988 on MCA Records under the composers' band name of Acoustic Alchemy. The current theme tune, introduced in 2014, is an arrangement of "Morning Light" by Will Gregory.

Links and spin offs
Former lead presenter, Alan Titchmarsh later teamed up with Charlie Dimmock and Tommy Walsh to make the series Ground Force. This was about rapid garden makeovers.

A book based on the history of the series entitled Gardeners' World Through The Years was released in 2003 by Gay Search.

BBC Gardeners' World Live
The BBC Gardeners' World Live Show is an extension of the television programme and magazine. Running annually in June, it is hosted at the Birmingham NEC, co-located with the BBC Summer Good Food Show.

The show includes live appearances from the presenters giving topical advice and tips including many of the presenters, such as Alan Titchmarsh, Monty Don, Carol Klein and Joe Swift, Toby Buckland, Alys Fowler, Chris Baines, Diarmuid Gavin, Anne Swithinbank, Pippa Greenwood, Rachel de Thame, Bob Flowerdew and Mark Lane.

The presenters film at BBC Gardeners' World Live, with the content aired within the programme on the Friday night of the live show.

Due to the COVID-19 pandemic, the 2020 show was cancelled, with the next scheduled for 17–20 June 2021.

A number of new rose varieties have been launched at the show including
 2016: Roses UK presented the new 'Eve Rose' to Simon Lycett on behalf of the Eve Foundation
 2008: Rachel de Thame presented the new rose 'Prince Caspian' to actor Ben Barnes
 2005: The show presented the new 'Duchess of Cornwall' rose to the Duchess of Cornwall

See also
 The Beechgrove Garden, a long-running gardening show from BBC Scotland.

References

External links
 'BBC Two: Gardeners' World'
 'BBC Gardeners' World Live'

BBC high definition shows
BBC Television shows
Gardening in the United Kingdom
1968 British television series debuts
1960s British television series
1970s British television series
1980s British television series
1990s British television series
2000s British television series
2010s British television series
2020s British television series
BBC Birmingham productions
Television series by BBC Studios
English-language television shows